Manohar Parrikar (born Manohar Gopalkrishna Prabhu Parrikar; 13 December 1955 – 17 March 2019) was an Indian politician and leader of the Bharatiya Janata Party who served as Chief Minister of Goa from 14 March 2017 until his death. Previously, he was Chief Minister of Goa from 2000 to 2005 and from 2012 to 2014 and from 2017 to 2019. He also served as the Minister of Defence from October 2014 to March 2017. In January 2020, he was posthumously awarded Padma Bhushan.

Parrikar proposed the name of Narendra Modi as the prime ministerial candidate before 2013 BJP parliamentary elections convention in Goa. He served in the National Democratic Alliance government under Prime Minister Narendra Modi as Defence Minister of India from 2014 to 2017. He was a former member of Rajya Sabha from Uttar Pradesh.

He was the first IIT alumnus to serve as MLA of an Indian state, the first IITian to become the Chief Minister of a state in India, the first Goan to become a cabinet-rank minister at the Centre, and also the first Chief Minister of a state to continue in office for over a year despite being diagnosed with terminal-stage cancer.

Early life and education
Manohar Parrikar was born to a Gaud Saraswat Brahmin family in Mapusa, Goa. He studied at Loyola High School, Margao. Parrikar completed his 10th Standard Board Examination at G.S. Amonkar Vidya Mandir, Mapusa which was previously known as New Goa High school. He completed his secondary education in Marathi and went on to graduate in Metallurgical Engineering from the Indian Institute of Technology, Bombay (IIT Bombay), in 1978. He was awarded the Distinguished Alumnus Award by IIT Bombay in 2001.

Political career
Parrikar joined the Rashtriya Swayamsevak Sangh (RSS) at a young age and became a mukhya shikshak (chief instructor) in the final years of his schooling. After graduating from IIT, he resumed RSS work in Mapusa while maintaining a private business, and became a sanghchalak (local director) at the age of 26. He was active in the RSS's North Goa unit, becoming a key organiser of the Ram Janmabhoomi movement. He was seconded by RSS to Bharatiya Janata Party (BJP) with the objective of fighting the Maharashtrawadi Gomantak Party. He is sometimes described as having been a pracharak of the RSS.

Chief Minister of Goa (200005), (201214), (201719)
As a member of the BJP, Parrikar was elected to the Legislative Assembly of Goa in 1994. He was leader of the opposition from June to November 1999. He successfully contested the election to become Chief Minister of Goa for the first time on 24 October 2000, but his tenure lasted only until 27 February 2002. In 2001, the Parrikar government had turned over fifty-one government primary schools in rural areas to Vidya Bharati, the educational wing of the Hindu nationalist group Sangh Parivar, inviting criticism from certain educationists.

On 5 June 2002, he was re-elected and served another term as Chief Minister. On 29 January 2005, his government was reduced to a minority in the Assembly after four BJP MLAs resigned from the House. Pratapsing Rane of the Indian National Congress would subsequently replace Parrikar as Chief Minister.

In 2007, the Parrikar led BJP was defeated in the Goa state elections by the Congress led by Digambar Kamat. BJP and their party-allies won twenty-four seats against the Congress' nine in the Goa Assembly Elections held in March 2012. In 2014, Parrikar drew criticism for approving a junket costing at least  for six MLAs from the ruling party, including three ministers, to attend the FIFA World Cup in Brazil. The Indian National Congress termed the trip "wasteful expenditure" and criticized the lack of other government officials or soccer experts in the delegation.

On 14 March 2017, Parrikar was sworn in as Chief Minister of Goa. Goa Forward Party led by Vijai Sardesai, one of the parties who allied with BJP in Goa after election results were announced, had said that it would extend support to the BJP only if Parrikar was brought back to the state as Chief Minister.

Union Minister for Defence (201417)

In the 2014 general elections, BJP won both the Lok Sabha seats in Goa. Parrikar was reluctant to leave Goa and move to Delhi in November 2014, by his own admission but was persuaded by Prime Minister Narendra Modi to join central government.

Parrikar was preceded by Laxmikant Parsekar as Goa's CM. Parrikar had represented the Panaji constituency in the Goa Legislative Assembly when he was a player in the state politics.

In November 2014, Parrikar was chosen as the Minister of Defence replacing Arun Jaitley, who, till then, held additional charge of the Ministry. His entry into the parliament was facilitated by choosing him as the party's candidate for the elected Rajya Sabha seat from Uttar Pradesh.

Controversies
In 2001, the Parrikar government turned over fifty-one government primary schools in rural areas to Vidya Bharati, the educational wing of the Sangh Parivar, inviting criticism from educationists. He also drew criticism for approving a junket costing at least  for six government MLAs from the ruling party, including three ministers, to attend the 2014 FIFA World Cup in Brazil. The Indian National Congress termed the trip "wasteful expenditure" and criticized the lack of other government officials or football experts in the delegation.

Parrikar often made remarks of controversial nature. In wake of the debate on religious intolerance in India and actor Aamir Khan stating that his wife Kiran Rao had asked to move out of India, Parrikar made a controversial remark that "if anyone speaks like this, he has to be taught a lesson of his life". He later clarified that he had not targeted any specific individual. In August 2016, Parrikar stated that going to Pakistan is the same thing as "going to hell". In November 2016, Parrikar, while serving as Minister of Defence of India, raised a question about why India should bind itself to the no first use policy.

In 2019, an audio tape of Poriem MLA Vishwajit Rane surfaced where he spoke to an unknown person claiming that the Dassault Rafale Aircraft deal papers were in then Chief Minister Manohar Parrikar's bedroom. Congress Leader Rahul Gandhi attempted to play the alleged audio tape in the Lok Sabha but was not allowed to do so.

Illness and death 
During March–June 2018, Parrikar was undergoing treatment for what would turn out to be pancreatic cancer at Memorial Sloan Kettering Cancer Center in New York, USA. He returned to India and in September was admitted in the AIIMS, Delhi for treatment. On 27 October 2018, the Government of Goa announced that Parrikar had pancreatic cancer.

He died on 17 March 2019 at the age of 63 from pancreatic cancer at his residence in Panaji. His death was announced by the President of India, Ram Nath Kovind in a tweet condoling his death. His death was condoled by PM Narendra Modi, HM Rajnath Singh, BJP president Amit Shah, INC president Rahul Gandhi, and several other political leaders from all over Goa and India.

On the evening of 18 March, Parrikar was cremated with full state honours at Miramar in Panaji.

Biography 
In June 2020, a biography titled "An Extraordinary Life : A Biography of Manohar Parrikar" was published by Penguin Random House India. The book, penned by journalists Sadguru Patil and Mayabhushan Nagvenkar, documents Parrikar's life and ascent to power.

Awards
2020: Padma Bhushan by Government of India
2018: Honorary Doctorate by National Institute of Technology Goa on 28 September 2018.
 2012: CNN-IBN Indian of the Year in politics category
2001: Distinguished Alumnus Award IIT-Mumbai

Legacy
The Indian Institute for Defense Studies and Analyses was renamed the Manohar Parrikar Institute for Defense Studies and Analyses in February of 2020.

In December 2022, the New International Airport at Mopa, Goa was named Manohar Parrikar International Airport.

References

External links

 Detailed Profile: Shri Manohar Parrikar

|-

|-

|-

Recipients of the Padma Bhushan in public affairs
1955 births
2019 deaths
Bharatiya Janata Party politicians from Goa
Chief ministers from Bharatiya Janata Party
Chief Ministers of Goa
Defence Ministers of India
IIT Bombay alumni
Leaders of the Opposition in Goa
Members of the Goa Legislative Assembly
Narendra Modi ministry
People from Mapusa
People from North Goa district
Rajya Sabha members from Uttar Pradesh
Rashtriya Swayamsevak Sangh pracharaks
Deaths from cancer in India
Deaths from pancreatic cancer
Members of the National Cadet Corps (India)